Mount Eden is a suburb in Auckland, New Zealand whose name honours George Eden, 1st Earl of Auckland. Mt Eden Road winds its way around the side of Mount Eden Domain and continues to weave back and forth as it descends into the valley; it runs south from Eden Terrace to Three Kings. Mt Eden village centre is located roughly between Valley Road and Grange Road. The domain is accessible on foot from many of the surrounding streets, and by vehicle from Mt Eden Road. The central focus of the suburb is Maungawhau / Mount Eden, a dormant volcano whose summit is the highest natural point on the Auckland isthmus.

History

Pre-European
In pre-European times Mount Eden was utilised as a fortified hill pa by various Māori tribes. The pa is thought to have been abandoned around 1700 AD after conflict between the resident Waiohua people and the Hauraki tribes The earth ramparts and terraces from this period contribute to the distinctive outline of the hill today.

Later settlement
The area directly around the hill consists of very fertile free-draining soil mixed with a great deal of volcanic debris in the form of scoria rocks. When Europeans came to the area, they found a landscape devoid of large trees, as anything of any size had been cut down by the Maori for various uses, such as the timber palisades of the pa. The land was covered with bracken, flax and Manuka trees, with whau shrubs growing on the hill. The Europeans cleared the land of the scoria rocks and made fences with them to define property boundaries. This resulted in a landscape reminiscent of Ireland or the Scottish lowlands. These scoria walls are still a feature of the suburb today.

Initially the land was utilised for farms, but from quite early on the area hosted country residences of professionals and business people from Auckland. Most of the farm land was subdivided into large suburban plots between 1870 and 1875, and the principal roads were formed by the Crown. Mt Eden's first school opened in 1877 on the corner of Mt Eden and Valley roads. In 1879 the mountain was officially protected as a public reserve. The tea kiosk on the slope of Mt Eden was built in 1927.

The Colonial Ammunition Company, first formed in 1885, was based at Mount Eden. The steel Mount Eden Shot Tower, completed in 1914, was the major supplier of ammunition in New Zealand until World War II, and was classified as a Category I heritage building by Heritage New Zealand in 1983.

Mount Eden is now a "leafy suburb" consisting predominantly of large houses from the first half of the 20th century, many with verdant gardens and large trees. In the 19th century, on the eastern slopes of Mt Eden were constructed several large country houses set in extensive grounds. These included "Harewood House" (since demolished and now the site of the Mater Hospital), Justice Gillies "Rocklands Hall" (now a hostel), Alfred Buckland's "Highwic" (now a museum), the Hellaby family's "Florence Court", Josiah Clifton Firth's "Clifton House" (both still private residences) and Professor Sir Algernon Thomas' "Trewithiel" (the garden is partially preserved in Withiel Thomas Reserve and the reduced house at 114 Mountain Road). Close by the current Government House (the official Auckland residence of the Governor General) is Eden Garden, a ornamental public garden set up in a disused quarry. 

In the 1950s and 1960s the inner suburbs became unfashionable and the old houses of the Mt Eden area were comparatively cheap to buy. Mt Eden developed a slightly bohemian image during this time as a community of artists, writers, teachers and university lecturers made it their home. Mt Eden village is still regarded by many as the "Home Of Arts" in Auckland, due to the large amount of creative activity in and around the suburb and the large number of artists who live nearby.

The Presbyterian Boys' Hostel at 22 View Road is a historic building that became the first home for many young men, who moved to Auckland to train in government and industry at low rates of pay.

Transport
In Mt Eden, the plentiful supply of volcanic stone (a suitable material for building roads), as well as the ready supply of labourers from the Mt Eden Prison, allowed for a progressive development of early roads, many of which still exist today as main arterial routes.  Toll gates were established on several main roads, including Mt Eden Road and Dominion Road, during the 19th century in order to help pay for their upkeep.

Public transportation extended from the inner city to the surrounding areas in the late 1870s and early 1880s with horse-drawn buses being the first mode of regular public transportation in the late 1870s.  In 1881, the long-awaited railway came, connecting Newmarket with Helensville with stops in Mt Eden, Kingsland, Morningside and Mt Albert.   At the beginning of the 20th century, trams began connecting Mt. Eden, Balmoral, Kingsland, and Mt Albert with the city. The trams ran for the last time in the 1950s.

Local government
Mt Eden falls within the Epsom constituencies for the national Parliament.  In terms of local government, Mt Eden comes under the Albert-Eden Local Board,  of Auckland Council. The Albert-Eden Local Board includes the suburbs of Waterview, Point Chevalier, Sandringham, Mount Albert, Morningside, Owairaka, Balmoral, Kingsland, Mt Eden, Epsom and Greenlane.

During the 19th century, the planning and maintenance of the main arterial roads (Mt Eden Road and Dominion Road) provided the impetus to form local governing bodies in the area. The Mt Eden Highway Board held its first meeting in 1868; it covered the area of Mt Eden, Eden Valley, Sandringham, and Balmoral. At the time, it was responsible for building and maintaining the roads and dealing with the pigs, horses, cattle, and sheep that freely roamed the area. In 1882 it became the Mt Eden Road Board. In 1906 Mt Eden gained borough status and the Mt Eden Borough Council was formed. In 1989 the Borough Council amalgamated with Auckland City Council in a nationwide local government reorganisation. And in November 2010, the City Council was dissolved and was incorporated into the new larger Auckland Council.

Mayors (1906–1989)
Oliver Nicholson, 1906–1918
Charles Hudson, 1918–1920
John Wisdom Shackelford, 1920–1923
Rev. James Leslie Allan Kayll, 1923–1923
Ernest Herbert Potter, 1923–1931
Thomas McNab, 1931–1938
Robert James Mills, 1938–1950
Alton Clive Johns, 1950–1959
Phillip Guy Dickinson, 1959–1962
Ernest Wilfred Turner, 1962–1968
Robert Claude Mills, 1968–1974
Ronald Athol Gribble, 1974–1977
William Noel Barton, 1977–1983
Philippa Anne Cunningham, 1983–1986
Gordon Brayden Johns, 1986–1989

Demographics

Mount Eden had a population of 14,697 at the 2018 New Zealand census, an increase of 819 people (5.9%) since the 2013 census, and an increase of 579 people (4.1%) since the 2006 census. There were 4,959 households, comprising 7,587 males and 7,104 females, giving a sex ratio of 1.07 males per female, with 2,109 people (14.3%) aged under 15 years, 4,098 (27.9%) aged 15 to 29, 7,170 (48.8%) aged 30 to 64, and 1,326 (9.0%) aged 65 or older.

Ethnicities were 69.3% European/Pākehā, 7.8% Māori, 5.3% Pacific peoples, 23.9% Asian, and 3.4% other ethnicities. People may identify with more than one ethnicity.

The percentage of people born overseas was 38.8, compared with 27.1% nationally.

Although some people chose not to answer the census's question about religious affiliation, 54.7% had no religion, 29.5% were Christian, 0.4% had Māori religious beliefs, 4.6% were Hindu, 1.3% were Muslim, 1.8% were Buddhist and 2.9% had other religions.

Of those at least 15 years old, 6,048 (48.0%) people had a bachelor's or higher degree, and 795 (6.3%) people had no formal qualifications. 3,462 people (27.5%) earned over $70,000 compared to 17.2% nationally. The employment status of those at least 15 was that 7,098 (56.4%) people were employed full-time, 1,902 (15.1%) were part-time, and 486 (3.9%) were unemployed.

Education
The term "Normal" comes from the French term ecole normale and means these schools assist in the training of teachers. Eden Campus is a Teen Parent Unit which provides secondary education to mothers and early childhood education to their children. It is associated with Auckland Girls' Grammar School. Rolls are as of 

There are several prestigious secondary schools located in Epsom, adjacent to Mt Eden, including St Peter's College, Epsom Girls Grammar School and Auckland Grammar School. The University of Auckland also has a campus in Epsom,  which was previously the Auckland College of Education.

Notable buildings

 Mount Eden Prison – 19th century Castle-like structure based on English prisons of the period. Built of local volcanic Basalt rock quarried onsite. Designed by Pierre Finch Martineau Burrows.
 Quaker Meeting House – 113 Mount Eden Road. Arts & Crafts building designed to harmonize with the houses of the area.
 Marino Gardens – Cnr Mt Eden and Esplanade Roads. An Art Deco Apartment Block. This building won its designer Kenneth W. Aimer a gold medal from the NZ Institute of Architects in 1936.
 Tram-stop – Mt Eden Road. Built at the entrance to the Mount Eden Domain in 1910 as a Tram Stop, this building was altered to include toilets around 1928. Wooden structure with Marseilles Tile roof.
 Mt Eden Kiosk – 1920s Tearooms built in the Bungalow Stucco style with Marseilles Tile roof.
 Mt Eden Pools – 30A Bellevue Road. There has been an indoor swimming pool facility here since the early 20th century. The water comes from rain falling on Mt Eden and having been filtered through the scoria rocks wells up here to feed the swimming baths.
 Former Council Chambers & Fire Station – Valley Road. Former Offices & Fire Station prior to the incorporation of Mt Eden Borough Council into Auckland City in 1989. Designed by Wade & Wade and opened in March 1913. This pair of classical styled buildings were enlarged in 1940. The Fire Station ceased functioning in 1970.
 Mount Eden Normal Primary School – Valley Road. War Memorial Gates in the classical style.
 St Barnabas Anglican Church – Mt Eden Road. The older part of this Selwyn church was brought from Mechanics Bay in 1877 where it had stood since the 1860s. the brick portion of this church was constructed in 1886.
Louis Aldophus Durrieu House - Mt Eden Road. 19th century wooden house which was the residence of an early settler - A portion of the property was donated by the family to the city as a park.
 Pan's Garden – Coles Avenue. A residential complex designed by James Chapman-Taylor in the mid 1920s in the 'garden suburb -Californian bungalow' style.
 Former Mount Eden Post Office. – Mt Eden Village. Designed by the office of the Government Architect John Campbell. Brick and stucco render building with Marseilles Tile roof.
 War Memorial Gates – end of Poronui Street. Constructed out of Portland Stone left over from the building of the Auckland War Memorial Museum.
 Mt Eden Methodist Church – Mt Eden Village. Wooden Gothic Church designed by Arthur White and completed in 1900.
 Crystal Palace Picture Theatre. 537 Mt Eden Road. Opened on 26 January 1929 by the then Mayor of Mt Eden, E. H. Potter.
 The 1958 Mount Eden War Memorial Hall located near the intersection of Dominion and Balmoral Roads.
 Rocklands Hall – Gillies Avenue. Grand 19th century Country Residence in the French Second Empire style with distinctive tower. The home of Justice Gillies this building once stood in the middle of a large estate. Now a students hostel for the nearby Teachers College.
 Brightside Hospital. Modern facility on the site of Colonel Owens residence 'Brightside'. Owens had an extensive garden which was noted for its collection of specimen trees & plants. Many of these still grace the grounds of the hospital and surrounding properties.
 Lynton House – Owens Road. 19th century wooden Gothic House situated high on the southern side of Mt Eden next to the Pines Apartment Block.
 The Pines Apartment Block. 1970s highrise apartment block on the site of a 19th-century house of the same name. The building of this tall structure on the side of Mt Eden resulted in new Bylaws to protect the volcanic cones of the isthmus.
 Florence Court – Omana Avenue. Large Italianate Mansion built by the Hellaby family and extended by the Seabrooks. The walled garden is a memorial constructed by the Seabrooks for their son who was killed in the Second World War.
 Government House – Mountain Road. Residence of the Governor-General since the early 1960s. This property was donated by Sir Frank and Lady Mappin in the 1950s so the "old" Government House in Waterloo Quadrant could be vacated. This house had been built as the residence of a Mr Rose, a partner in a high class furniture manufacturing company, Rose & Heather, a company which is still active.
 Amohia, 127 Mountain Road. Located next to Government House. The house is typical of those built in the 1880s but it was possibly moved here in 1912. The Auckland industrialist and entrepreneur Joseph James Craig (1860–1916) had this house re-erected here – possibly moved from a site on Symonds Street. Craig had purchased the empty site  here in 1907. The Chimney pots, and the bricks in the steps, may have been produced by Craig's extensive Avondale brick works.
 Whitecliffe – 2 Castle Drive. Originally 45 Mountain Road. A two storied brick mansion built in 1908 for William Elliot, a mining engineer. William Elliot (c.1864–1934) contributed £4000 of the total £9500 cost for the completion of construction of the Wintergardens in the Auckland Domain, as well as £10,000 "for appropriate entrances to the Domain"
 Firth Castle – Castle Drive.  Josiah Firth was quite enthusiastic about cast-concrete and built the tower of this building onto his wooden gothic house (called Clifton House) in 1873–1876. Of solid concrete [no metal reinforcing] this tower was surmounted by a water tank to provide good water pressure for his state of the art bath rooms as well as a private study cum geological & botany museum room for Mr Firth. He also built a similar gothic concrete tower in Matamata where he owned large areas of land which produced mainly grain crops. His sons went on to found the Firth Concrete Company. The house, which once stood in extensive grounds, now long sold off, was divided into flats in the 1960s.
 Trewithiel – 114 Mountain Road built for Algernon Thomas, first professor of natural sciences at Auckland University College, in 1890. The house was reduced in size in the early 1960s and Thomas's 4 hectares garden was subdivided in the 1940s; a portion of the property was retained as Withiel Thomas Reserve. Thomas was chairman of the Auckland Grammar School Board between 1916 and 1937 and was largely responsible for the layout of the grounds of the nearby Auckland Grammar School.
 Mercy Hospital – Mater Misericordiae Hospital – Private Hospital run by the Roman Catholic Church. This occupies the site of Harewood House, a grand 19th century Italianate residence.
 Rannoch – Almorah Place. Large 1920s house built by a Canadian dentist. The extensive gardens to the north of the house were destroyed when the motorway was constructed in the 1970s. The house was built for Frederick John Rayner, a Canadian born American who settled in Auckland in 1900. He was well known as a dentist and was involved with a variety of other activities. He was governing director of Amalgamated Theatres and had logging interests at Piha. From 1932–63 the house was owned by Sir Carrick Robertson, knighted for his services to medicine. He was associated with the foundation of Mater Misericordiae Hospital. Rannoch is currently the home of the art collector Sir James Wallace.
 Tibbs House – cnr of Mountain and Clive Roads. Former residence of a headmaster of the nearby boys school this Edwardian mansion is now accommodation for boarders and has several modern additions.
 Auckland Grammar School. Founded in the 1850s this school relocated here in 1916. A collection of Spanish Mission Style buildings by Arnold & Abbott form the centre of this school.
 Headmasters House – opposite Auckland Grammar. For most of the 20th century Headmasters of Auckland Grammar resided in this house.
 Stoneways – 46 Mountain Road. Important 1930s Modernist Art-Deco house by William Gummer(1884–1966, designed as his own home. Stoneways featured in an account of the development of architecture in New Zealand in the nineteenth edition of Sir Banister Fletcher’s History of Architecture.
 40 Mountain Rd. Two storied residence built around 1910 for Mr William McKenzie Commans.
 St Peter's College and Christian Brothers House, 1939–1944,  designed by William Henry Gummer, architect, extant; 23 Mountain Rd; built on land gifted in 1925 by the Outhwaite family.
 Whare ra – 26 Clive Road. "House of the Sun" An experimental concrete house built in 1927 for Trevor Lloyd(1863–1937). Lloyd was the cartoonist for the Dominion Newspaper and seems to be the first person to use a kiwi bird as a representation of a New Zealander. The house is an experiment in the modernist Bauhaus style but is built into the hillside like the works of Frank Lloyd Wright. The building has a number of sculptural details using maori motifs.
 Prison Officers Houses – North side of Clive Road. A group of house built for the staff of the nearby prison. Substantial residences incorporating local volcanic stone quarried by prison labour in the adjacent quarry.

There are three War Memorials in the Mount Eden area;
The War Memorial Gates at the Mount Eden Normal Primary School in Valley Road (opposite the former Mt Eden Borough Council Chambers)
The War Memorial Gates at the entrance to the Former College of Education (end of Poronui street, designed in 1932 by the Auckland Education Board architect Alan Miller, built of Portland stone left over from building the Auckland War Memorial Museum)
The 1958 Mount Eden War Memorial Hall located near the intersection of Dominion and Balmoral Roads.

Mount Eden Prison

To many New Zealanders the name Mount Eden is linked with Mount Eden Prison, which was built in a castle style between 1882 and 1917. It is constructed out of the local basalt rock, one of the very few buildings built in this uncompromising material. Built with prison labour it was designed by P.F.M. Burrows and is similar in appearance to Dartmoor Prison in England.

Transportation
Mt Eden is well served by trains and buses, and is only  from Auckland’s CBD. The train station is located at the north side of Mt Eden, between Ngahura Street and Fenton Street. Mount Eden Railway Station is a part of the Western Line; trains run regularly into the city and the western suburbs beyond.

The centre of all the shopping and business activities in Mt Eden village is Mt Eden Road, between Oaklands Road and Grange Road. By vehicle Mt Eden can be accessed from the Southern Motorway (SH1) by taking the Green Lane off-ramp, and continuing onto Balmoral Road or from the City end – via Symonds Street and Mt Eden Road. Mount Eden domain is located just north of the village centre along Mt Eden Road.

Notable residents

Professor Sir Algernon Thomas (1857–1937), professor of natural sciences at Auckland University College 1883–1914, lived at Trewithiel on Mountain Road from 1890 until his death.
Cyril Bassett, – Victoria Cross recipient.
Hamish Carter – New Zealand Triathlete that won gold at the 2004 Summer Olympics.
James Chapman-Taylor – Architect – designed a set of houses for his family in Valley Road called Pan's Garden.
Josiah Clifton Firth  (1826–1897) – Businessman – Constructed a concrete castle called Clifton House. 
Louis Aldophus Durrieu – Settler – lived on Mount Eden Road.
William Elliot (c.1864–1934) – Local businessman, Chair of the 1913 Auckland Exhibition.
Christine Fletcher Mayor of Auckland and MP
Dick Frizzell – Painter
Justice Gillies – High Court Judge – Thomas Bannatyne Gillies (1828–1889) Lived at Rocklands Hall on Gillies Avenue.
Phil Goff – Mayor of Auckland, Former Labour Party Leader and Foreign and Defence Minister, was born in Mount Eden.
William Gummer – Architect – Lived in a house called Stoneways on Mountain Road.
Amy Hellaby (Amy Maria Briscoe) Widow of Richard Hellaby (Butchery Empire) lived at Bramcote (now Florence Court) Omana Avenue.
Paul Holmes (1950–2013) – Television journalist
Trevor Lloyd – Cartoonist for the Dominion Newspaper and seems to be the first to use a kiwi bird as a representation of a New Zealander. Lived in a concrete house he designed himself in Clive Road.
Sir Frank Mappin (1884–1975) Orchardist, horticulturist, philanthropist – Lived at Birchlands, Mountain Road.
Lady Mappin – Eliza Ruby Thomson (- 1973). Together with her husband in 1969, donated Birchlands to be the current Auckland Government House.
Colonel Owens – Landowner – Lived at a house called Brightside in Owens Road.
Stanley Palmer – Painter
Ian Scott – Artist, lived and worked on Marsden Avenue 1981 until his death
Lala Seabrook – Socialite and collector – lived at Florence Court.
Philip Seabrook ( – 1972) – Director of Seabrook Fowlds Motor Corporation. Lived at Florence Court, Omana Avenue.
Wolfgang Strauss – Health food manufacturer – political refugee.
Katherine Styles – illegitimate daughter of Benjamin Disraeli
Sir James Wallace – Businessman and Art Collector. Resides at Rannoch, Almorah Place.
Karl Wolfskehl (1869–1948) German Poet – political refugee.
Brent Wong – Painter

See also
Eden (New Zealand electorate)

References

The Lively Capital, Auckland 1840–1865. Una Platts. Avon Fine Prints Limited New Zealand 1971.
Colonial Architecture In New Zealand. John Stacpoole.  A.H & A.W Reed 1976.
Volcanoes of Auckland: The Essential guide – Hayward, B.W., Murdoch, G., Maitland, G.; Auckland University Press, 2011.

External links
 Friends of Maungawhau website
 Mt Eden Village – Mt Eden Business Association
 Mt Eden Village Centre
 Maungawhau Heritage Walks:Four Mt Eden Neighbourhood Walks
 Eden Garden
 Eden Arts website
 Photographs of Mount Eden held in Auckland Libraries' heritage collections.

Suburbs of Auckland